The Hidden Valley Dolomite is a Silurian−Devonian geologic formation in the northern Mojave Desert of California, in the western United States.

Locations where it is exposed include sections of the southern Inyo Mountains and the Talc City Hills.

Hidden Valley Dolomite overlies the Ely Springs Dolomite formation, and underlies the Lost Burro Formation.

Paleontology
Outcrops of the Hidden Valley Dolomite formation's Lippincott Member in Death Valley National Park have produced fossils of the fishes Panamintaspis snowi and Blieckaspis priscillae along with the remains of other jawless fishes and a small arthrodire placoderm.

See also

References

Devonian California
Silurian California
Dolomite formations
Death Valley National Park
Geology of Inyo County, California
Natural history of the Mojave Desert
Devonian System of North America
Silurian System of North America
Geologic formations of California